Kantarō, Kantaro, Kantarou or Kantaroh (written: ,  or ) is a masculine Japanese given name. Notable people with the name include:

, Japanese-born Korean professional wrestler, manager, and promoter
, Japanese actor
, Imperial Japanese Navy admiral and Prime Minister of Japan
, Japanese businessman

See also
Kantaro: The Sweet Tooth Salaryman, a Japanese television series

Japanese masculine given names